This is a list of Dutch television related events from 1993.

Events
Unknown - Ellen Fransz, performing as Whitney Houston wins the ninth series of Soundmixshow.

Debuts

Television shows

1950s
NOS Journaal (1956–present)

1970s
Sesamstraat (1976–present)

1980s
Jeugdjournaal (1981–present)
Soundmixshow (1985-2002)
Het Klokhuis (1988–present)

1990s
Goede tijden, slechte tijden (1990–present)

Ending this year

Births

Deaths